Macrocilix trinotata is a moth in the family Drepanidae. It was described by Hong-Fu Chu and Lin-Yao Wang in 1988. It is found in Xizang, China.

The length of the forewings is about 19 mm. Adults are similar to Macrocilix mysticata, but the patch on the forewings is narrower and longer and has a sharper top. The marginal and submarginal lines are distinct. The hindwings have three distinct black dots surrounded by yellow circles at the anal area.

References

Moths described in 1988
Drepaninae
Moths of Asia